The Holy-mountain salamander (Bolitoglossa heiroreias) is a species of salamander in the family Plethodontidae.
It is found in El Salvador, Guatemala, and possibly Honduras.
Its natural habitat is subtropical or tropical moist montane forests.
It is threatened by habitat loss.

References

Bolitoglossa
Taxonomy articles created by Polbot
Amphibians described in 2004